Paal Nilssen-Love (born December 24, 1974) is a Norwegian drummer active in the jazz and free jazz genres.

He has released two solo albums, and his portfolio includes Atomic, School Days, The Thing, Scorch Trio, Territory Band, FME, and various duo projects such as with reedmen Peter Brötzmann, Ken Vandermark, John Butcher, organist Nils Henrik Asheim and noise experimentalist Lasse Marhaug.

Solo

As band leader

Townhouse Orchestra

Large Unit

As co-leader or sideperson

ADA (Peter Brötzmann, Fred Lonberg-Holm, Paal Nilssen-Love)

Adam Lane, Ken Vandermark, Magnus Boo, Paal Nilssen-Love

Anker

Arto Lindsay, Paal Nilssen-Love

Atomic

Atomic/School Days

Bjørnar Andresen, Svein Finnerud, Paal Nilssen-Love

Boneshaker (Mars Williams, Paal Nilssen-Love, Kent Kessler)

Bradford, Gjerstad, Håker Flaten, Nilssen-Love

Bradford, Gjerstad, Nilssen-Love

Brötzmann, Michiyo Yagi, Nilssen-Love

Brötzmann, Swell, Nilssen-Love

Bugge Wesseltoft's New Conceptions Of Jazz

Calling Signals

Christer Bothen Acoustic Ensemble

Circulasione Totale Orchestra

Crimetime Orchestra

Didrik Ingvaldsen

Double Tandem (Ab Baars, Ken Vandermark, Paal Nilssen-Love)

Element

Fireroom

FME (Free Music Ensemble)

Fred Lonberg-Holm, Paal Nilssen-Love

Frode Gjerstad, Fred Lonberg-Holm, Amit Sen, Paal Nilssen-Love

Frode Gjerstad and Paal Nilssen-Love

Frode Gjerstad Trio

Ingoma

Joe McPhee / Paal Nilssen-Love

John Butcher / Paal Nilssen-Love

Jon Eberson, Bjørnar Andresen, Paal Nilssen-Love

Ken Vandermark / Paal Nilssen-Love

Kornstad trio

Lars Göran Ullander trio

Lasse Marhaug / Paal Nilssen-Love

Magnus Broo / Paal Nilssen-Love

Marilyn Crispell

Masahiko Satoh, Paal Nilssen-Love

Mats Gustafsson, Paal Nilssen-Love, Mesele Asmamaw

Michiyo Yagi, Ingebrigt Håker Flaten, Paal Nilssen-Love

Michiyo Yagi, Joe McPhee, Lasse Marhaug, Paal Nilssen-Love

Michiyo Yagi, Lasse Marhaug, Paal Nilssen-Love

Nils Henrik Asheim / Paal Nilssen-Love

No spagetti edition

OFFONOFF

Original Silence

Paal Nilssen-Love, Anders Hana

Paal Nilssen-Love, Håkon Kornstad

Paal Nilssen-Love, Massimo Pupillo, Lasse Marhaug

Paal Nilssen-Love, Mats Gustafsson

Paal Nilssen-Love, Michiyo Yagi, Peter Brötzmann

The Peter Brötzmann Chicago tentet

Peter Brötzmann / Paal Nilssen-Love

Peter Brötzmann, Paal Nilssen-Love and Mats Gustafsson

Peter Janson, Jonas Kullhammar, Paal Nilssen-Love

Pocket Corner

(((Powerhouse Sound)))

Quintet

Rodrigo Amado, Kent Kessler, Paal Nilssen-Love

Samsa'Ra

San

School Days

Scorch Trio

Sten Sandell Trio

Steve Hubback / Paal Nilssen-Love

Terrie Ex & Paal Nilson-Love

Territory Band

The Thing

See also The Music of Norman Howard, an album by School Days and The Thing.

Two Bands and a Legend

Trygve Seim

Wunderkammer

Zim Ngqawana

Compilations

See also
Ingebrigt Håker Flaten discography
Rune Grammofon discography
List of experimental big bands

References

General

 

 

Specific

External links 
 Official webpage

Jazz discographies
Discographies of Norwegian artists